Kate Scott is an American sportscaster who is currently the television play-by-play announcer for the Philadelphia 76ers. She also calls men's and women's soccer for Fox Sports (U.S.) Scott is the first full-time female broadcaster in the city of Philadelphia, and one of the first women to be the primary play-by-play caller for an NBA team.

Early life 
Scott was born in Fresno, California, and raised in Clovis, California. She graduated from Clovis High School in 2001. She attended UC Berkeley where she majored in communications. As a sophomore, she became the school's first female "Mic Man", leading cheers in the student section for their football and basketball games. She wrote for The Bear Insider magazine, and its ESPN affiliated website. She did an internship with KLLC ("Alice @ 97.3"). She graduated in 2005.

Career 
After graduating college, Scott soon joined Metro Networks, where she was a reporter, producer, and anchor, doing traffic, news, and sports updates for a number of Bay Area radio stations including KSFO-AM, KFRC-AM, KCBS-AM, KFOG-FM, and KNBR-AM. During that time, she also did some on-screen television reporting for Cal football for CSN California.

She joined KNBR full-time in 2011 where she provided sports updates for their morning and midday shows and filled in as a substitute host. She also served as a television sideline reporter for the San Jose Earthquakes, reported for the San Jose Giants minor league team, called high school football for Comcast, and anchored Saturday night sports for NBC Bay Area.

In August 2016, Scott became the first woman to call an NFL game on the radio. She covered two preseason games for the San Francisco 49ers.

In December 2016, she left KNBR to join the Pac-12 Network full-time, to focus on play-by-play. In 2017, she became the first woman to call a football game on the Pac-12 Network. In addition to calling football, men's and women's soccer, men's and women's basketball, softball, and volleyball for the Network, Scott also anchored, reported, and hosted the Network's award-winning features program "Our Stories".

For International Women’s Day on March 8, 2020, she was part of the first-ever all-women's broadcast crew for a National Hockey League game on NBCSN. Scott provided play-by-play with Olympians A.J. Mleczko and Kendall Coyne Schofield as analysts.

In October 2020, she joined KGMZ-FM (95.7 "The Game") as a co-host of their morning show. She continued to work with the Pac-12 Network.

On March 29, 2021, she became the first woman to call a Golden State Warriors game (and the first to do play-by-play of any NBA game on the radio) as she and sportscasters Mary Murphy, Kerith Burke, and Chiney Ogwumike covered the Warriors game against the Chicago Bulls.  For the 2020 Summer Olympics, Scott provided play-by-play for the majority of the men's and women's basketball games on NBC. In August 2021, she left 95.7 "The Game" and joined radio host Mike Golic to call 13 national games of the week for Learfield and their newly launched brand College Football Saturday Night.

On September 23, 2021, it was announced that Scott would become the television play-by-play announcer for the Philadelphia 76ers, replacing the retiring Marc Zumoff.  She became the second woman to do a full-time play-by-play role for a major men's professional sports team, after Lisa Byington for the Milwaukee Bucks.

Personal life 
While she was an intern with KLLC, Scott met and later married her wife Nicole in San Francisco. They have a pit bull named Piper, who is a rescue.

Although she is not religious, Scott says that she was raised in the Jewish faith and culture by her mother. Scott is a member of the Jewish Sports Hall of Fame of Northern California. Her father is Methodist.

References

External links 
 

Year of birth missing (living people)
Living people
Philadelphia 76ers announcers
College football announcers
American sports radio personalities
American sports announcers
American LGBT broadcasters
University of California, Berkeley alumni
People from Clovis, California
People from the San Francisco Bay Area
Jewish American sportspeople